Noyan is a municipality in the province of Quebec, Canada, located in Le Haut-Richelieu Regional County Municipality. The population as of the Canada 2011 Census was 1,297.

Demographics

Population

Language

See also
List of municipalities in Quebec

References

External links

Noyan official website

Municipalities in Quebec
Incorporated places in Le Haut-Richelieu Regional County Municipality